Penisa'r-waun is a small village which is located 4 miles to the east of Caernarfon and a mile to the northeast of Llanrug on the A4547 in Gwynedd, north-west Wales.

Education
The village includes a primary school, Ysgol Gymuned Penisarwaun, that instructs around 60 pupils aged between 3–11. The school is categorised as a Welsh-medium primary school and around 70% of the pupils come from Welsh-speaking homes.

Governance
Penisa'r-waun is an electoral ward in the area. The majority of the population is shown as being in Llanddeiniolen community. The total population of the ward taken at the 2011 census was 1,768.

References

External links 

www.geograph.co.uk : photos of Penisa'r Waun and surrounding area

Villages in Gwynedd
Llanddeiniolen